Abacetus picipes is a species of ground beetle in the subfamily Pterostichinae. It was described by Victor Motschulsky in 1866.

References

picipes
Beetles described in 1866